Air Cdre Geoffrey Nicolas Ernest Tindal-Carill-Worsley CB CBE RAF (8 June 1908 - 28 April 1996) was a Royal Air Force officer.

He was the son of Philip Tindal-Carill-Worsley and the first cousin of Group Captain Nicolas Tindal-Carill-Worsley.  Educated at Eton College and RAF College, Cranwell.  He was commissioned into the RAF in 1928, and served during the Second World War and was appointed CBE in 1943 and CB in 1954.

References 

1908 births
1996 deaths
People educated at Eton College
Graduates of the Royal Air Force College Cranwell
Commanders of the Order of the British Empire
Companions of the Order of the Bath
Royal Air Force officers
Royal Air Force personnel of World War II